Hunting Park station is a SEPTA subway stop in Philadelphia.  Served by the Broad Street Line, it is located at 4200 North Broad Street at Hunting Park Avenue in the Hunting Park section of North Philadelphia, Pennsylvania. This is a local station, and thus has four tracks, with only the outer two being served. There are separate fare control areas for the northbound and southbound platforms, and no crossover exists.

Hunting Park station is located east of Marcus Foster Memorial Stadium, and south and east of US 13.

Station layout

Gallery

References

External links 

SEPTA Broad Street Line stations
Railway stations in the United States opened in 1928
Railway stations in Philadelphia
Railway stations located underground in Pennsylvania
1928 establishments in Pennsylvania